The Museum of Australian Democracy at Eureka (M.A.D.E.) was a museum dedicated to democracy, located at the site of the Eureka Rebellion in Ballarat, Victoria, Australia.  It opened on 4 May 2013 and replaced the previous Eureka Stockade Centre.  MADE's launch in 2013 was hampered by budget overruns and long delays.

The museum focused on the Eureka Stockade as the place of origin of Australia's democracy.  The museum housed the original Eureka Flag, upon which the rebels swore an oath to the flag as a symbol of defiance against the ruling colonial government.  The flag was on loan from the Art Gallery of Ballarat.

Governance 
The Museum of Australian Democracy at Eureka was established as an independent not-for-profit organisation with a board of directors and with tax deductible charity status. Its sole member was the City of Ballarat.  During its five-year existence, the museum had two Chairs of the board: Professor David Battersby AM and Kaaren Koomen AM.

MADE's was supported by three notable patrons: Lucy Turnbull AO, Rob Knowles AO and former Victorian Premier Steve Bracks AC. Peter FitzSimons AM was an Ambassador for the museum.

The museum received an annual grant from the City of Ballarat of approximately $1 million. The museum also received triennial funding from Creative Victoria's OIP grant program and the Department of Education and Training, as well as other donors. The museum's annual turnover was approximately $2 million and in each year of operation it posted a financial a surplus.

Closure 
At its February 2018 Ordinary Council Meeting, the City of Ballarat Council made the decision to take over management responsibility of the centre. The decision came after lengthy consideration of a feasibility study prepared for Council on the future of the museum.

The Museum of Australian Democracy ceased trading on 31 March 2018, only two months before its fifth anniversary.  The Council took over the centre, continuing to exhibit the flag, and engaged the Ballarat community to determine the next steps for a community centre based on the site.  The Museum of Australian Democracy voluntarily deregistered with ASIC in May 2018, after transferring its assets to the City of Ballarat and de-accessioning its collection, returning borrowed and donated objects to donors.

History of the Eureka site 
In 1854 a period of civil disobedience by gold miners over the actions of the government culminated in a rebellion at Eureka, Victoria, during which at least 27 people, mostly rebels, died. It was the most prominent rebellion in Australia's history. It is held to be the birthplace of Australian democracy. 

Various memorials have been erected at the site since the rebellion, with the former Eureka Centre being refurbished to become the Museum of Australian Democracy at Eureka between 2011 and 2013. This development was funded by $5 million from both the Australian and Victorian governments and $1.1 million from the City of Ballarat.

The Museum of Australian Democracy at Eureka redevelopment project was managed by Katherine Armstrong from Lateral Projects. The building was designed by architects Beveridge Williams and included a 114-seat theatre, and a cafe.

The original business case for the Museum of Australian Democracy at Eureka anticipated that annual visitation would reach 125,000. In 2017, the museum reached a record 68,000 visitors.

Following MADE's closure, a public lobby group called for the return of the flag to the Art Gallery of Ballarat. The public debate over the MADE site and the Eureka story also continued.

Exhibitions and awards 
MADE explored the powerful story of the Eureka Stockade and life on the Gold Fields in the 1850s as a significant part of the struggle for peoples’ rights in Australia and around the world. MADE commemorated the pivotal role of the Stockade in shaping Australia's democracy. This is where a group of largely young people fought injustice, and won some of the first democratic rights in the world. The key feature of the exhibition was the original Eureka Flag that was first flown at the site of the centre during the Eureka Rebellion in 1854.

MADE's permanent exhibition used innovative digital immersion to engage visitors with the questions: What is democracy and why do we care? Why has it been fought for, yesterday and today? What does it feel like to be without power? Combining contemporary technology with historic objects, the role of the people as the centre of democracy was explored. How are decisions made? Who are they made for? What influence do you have in our contemporary democracy today?   

Through a series of public programs and temporary exhibitions, visitors were inspired to explore diversity, creativity and the hidden stories of the past and present. As a centre of discussion on contemporary democracy, MADE hosted some of Australia's most creative thinkers through partnerships with The Wheeler Centre and Melbourne Writers Festival.  In its time, the museum welcomed Anne Summers, Yassmin Abdel-Magied, Clare Wright, Deng Adut, Gail Kelly and many more.

The museum also housed the Quilt of Hope, a community art project created by the Moving Towards Justice group which commemorated the lives of victims of institutional sexual abuse in Ballarat. After the museum was closed, the Quilt of Hope was donated to the Museum of Australian Democracy at Old Parliament House in Canberra.

The museum's regular exhibitions brought wide praise, including

 The Campaign for Disability Rights: Grassroots Democracy
 Bling which brought together Gold Fields jewellery for the first time in 2016
 Chinese Fortunes which examined the migration experience from China. Chinese Fortunes travelled to The Immigration Museum in Melbourne and the Kyenton Museum, in regional Victoria. 
 Our Wonderful World 
 Roses from the Heart 
 Historyonics: the Monster Petition
 Eureka Day anniversary celebrations, particularly the 160th anniversary and the recreation of the Eureka Flag by descendants. 

Between its opening in 2013 and closure in 2018, the Museum of Australian Democracy at Eureka had more than 262,000 visitors, with almost 40,000 visits from students attending the highly regarded primary and secondary schools program.

During its five years of operation, MADE won a number of awards:

 2017 Commerce Ballarat's Visit Ballarat Business Excellence Awards for Special Events and Attractions
 2015 Winner for Innovation in the MAGNA Awards run by Museum and Galleries National for the Eureka Day 160th Anniversary Program
 2013 Achievement Award for Excellence in category of Partner, VCAL promotion from the Victorian Curriculum and Assessment Authority
 2013 Eureka Democracy Award from Eureka's Children.

Controversies 
The museum was subject to a number of controversies in its short life.

Many people in Ballarat remember fondly the Eureka Centre, a tourism and visitor centre which at its peak attracted 25,000 people each year.  The Eureka Centre was home to a diorama which explained the Eureka Stockade. The diorama disappeared in the development of the Museum of Australian Democracy at Eureka and has become a local Ballarat mystery.

The museum's initial development ran over budget and caused ongoing political ramifications in the media and in public discourse.

In November 2017, cafe owner Saltbush Kitchen decided to discontinue its presence at MADE after months of uncertainty over the museum's future.

In early 2018, Federal MP, Catherine King gave a speech in federal parliament accusing the City of Ballarat of changing its priorities in relation to MADE's funding arrangement.

Three weeks prior to the City of Ballarat's vote on the future of the museum, Deputy Mayor Daniel Moloney resigned from the board of MADE, citing conflicts of interest.

References

Further reading 
 Museum of Australian Democracy at Eureka to open in May | The Courier
 MP believes Eureka story deserves greater recognition in Australian schools | Barossa & Light Herald
 Eureka cries as flag returned 'home'
 http://www.couriermail.com.au/news/queensland/family-donates-its-fragment-of-original-eureka-flag-to-museum/story-fnihsrf2-1226774265140
 Eureka! Piece of Australian history unearthed at Nambour | Sunshine Coast Daily

External links
 Museum of Australian Democracy at Eureka  (M.A.D.E) at Google Cultural Institute

Museums in Ballarat
Defunct museums in Australia
2013 establishments in Australia
Museums established in 2013
Museums disestablished in 2018
2018 disestablishments in Australia